Harmotona is a genus of moths belonging to the family Tineidae. It contains only one species, Harmotona diplochorda, which is found in India.

The wingspan is about 9 mm. The forewings are elongate and light grey, partially tinged 
with whitish, although they are tinged brownish towards the apex. The hindwings are grey.

References

Tineidae
Monotypic moth genera
Moths of Asia
Tineidae genera
Taxa named by Edward Meyrick